The Enterprise Center is an 18,096-seat arena located in downtown St. Louis, Missouri, United States. Its primary tenant is the St. Louis Blues of the National Hockey League, but it is also used for other functions, such as NCAA basketball, NCAA hockey, concerts, professional wrestling and more. In a typical year, the facility hosts about 175 events. Industry trade publication Pollstar has previously ranked Enterprise Center among the top ten arenas worldwide in tickets sold to non-team events, but the facility has since fallen into the upper sixties, as of 2017.

The arena opened in 1994 as the Kiel Center. It was known as the Savvis Center from 2000 to 2006, and Scottrade Center from 2006 to 2018. On May 21, 2018, the St. Louis Blues and representatives of Enterprise Holdings, based in St. Louis, announced that the naming rights had been acquired by Enterprise and that the facility's name, since July 1, 2018, adopted its current name.

History

The site was home to Charles H. Turpin's Booker T. Washington Theater which was replaced by the Municipal Auditorium. It was renamed for mayor Kiel.

The arena was opened in 1994 to replace Kiel Auditorium, where the Saint Louis University college basketball team had played, which was torn down in December 1992. The Blues had played in the St. Louis Arena prior to moving into Kiel Center in 1994; however, they would not play in the arena until January 1995 due to the lockout that delayed the start of the 1994–95 season. The first professional sports match was played by the St. Louis Ambush, an indoor soccer team. The building is currently known as Enterprise Center, after naming rights were sold in May 2018 to Enterprise Holdings. The Kiel name still exists on the adjoining parking structure and the building cornerstone. Signs for the nearby MetroLink stop have been changed to read "Civic Center", since the building has been renamed four times in its history.

The Opera House portion of the building was not razed when the original Auditorium was but remained closed since 1992, as members of Civic Progress, Inc., who promised to pay for the renovation of the Opera House, reneged on that promise, while opposing all outside efforts to achieve that renovation. In June 2009, the St. Louis Board of Aldermen voted 25–1 to subsidize the renovation and reopening of the Opera House under the direction of its new owners, Sports Capital Partners (who also own the Blues). The subsidies were funded by municipal bonds and state/federal historic tax credits. On July 12, 2010, it was announced that the name of the opera house would be changed to the Peabody Opera House, named after the company Peabody Energy. On October 1, 2011, the Peabody Opera House opened for the first time since the $79 million renovation. It is now known as the Stifel Theatre after naming rights were purchased by the locally based investment bank.

Through its history, the arena has been known as Kiel Center until 2000, Savvis Center from 2000 to 2006, Scottrade Center from 2006 to 2018, and Enterprise Center since July 2018. For Blues games, Tom Calhoun serves as public address announcer and Jeremy Boyer is the arena organist. National anthems are performed by a rotating group of local singers and musicians. Previous anthem singer Charles Glenn retired in 2018 due to health concerns and a relocation to San Diego, but he has returned to St. Louis to sing on multiple occasions including the 2019 Stanley Cup run. Two Building Operations/Ice Technicians, Jim Schmuke and Dave Grimes have been employed there since August 1994.

The largest crowd to attend an event at the arena was 22,612, which happened twice during the 2007 Missouri Valley Conference men's basketball tournament. The largest non-sporting event crowd was for a Bon Jovi concert in May 2011 as part of the Bon Jovi Live Tour, with 20,648 in attendance.

A three-phase renovation of the arena began in 2017 and was completed in 2019, with all building works being done in the hockey offseason to minimize schedule disruption. The first phase was largely composed of engineering upgrades (new lighting, sound, HVAC, and ice plant), improved IT infrastructure including free Wi-Fi for patrons, and rebuilt dressing rooms, as well as a new scoreboard and replacement of some lower-tier seating on the west end (where the Blues shoot twice) with "theater boxes". Phase two saw the replacement of all upper-tier seats, along with "theater boxes" being added to the east end, and a rebuilt lower-tier concourse with new club areas for premium ticketholders as well as a beer garden opening onto 14th Street. The third and final phase included the replacement of lower-tier seats and renovations to private boxes.

Naming rights
Blues management decried its former naming-rights deal with tech company SAVVIS, as much of the compensation was in Savvis shares, then riding high. However, when the tech bubble burst, the team was left with nearly worthless shares.

In September 2006, Scottrade founder Rodger O. Riney and chief marketing officer Chris Moloney announced a partnership with the St. Louis Blues hockey club and arena. The new name of the arena, Scottrade Center, was revealed in a joint press conference. Terms of the deal were not disclosed, but were described as "long-term and significant", by Moloney. Both Scottrade and the Blues said the agreement was "equitable" to both parties. Most of the signage and other promotions were changed to Scottrade Center prior to the first home game of the Blues on October 12, 2006. The Sports Business Journal in March 2007 described it as "one of the fastest naming rights deals in history."

Scottrade announced on October 24, 2016 that it was being sold to TD Ameritrade for $4 billion. It was originally believed that once the deal closed, Scottrade Center would become the TD Ameritrade Center in a naming rights deal set to run until 2021. However, less than a year later, TD Ameritrade announced that it would give back its naming rights upon the closure of the Scottrade acquisition.

On May 21, 2018, Enterprise Holdings, based in St. Louis, and the St. Louis Blues announced that beginning July 1, the facility would be known as Enterprise Center. The 15-year agreement calls for interior and exterior signage featuring the Enterprise logo.

Current tenants
It is the home of the St. Louis Blues of the National Hockey League. In addition to the NHL franchise, the facility has hosted the annual Missouri Valley Conference men's basketball tournament since 1995, commonly referred to as "Arch Madness," with the winner receiving an automatic berth to the NCAA tournament. The University of Illinois and University of Missouri play their annual men's basketball rivalry game at Enterprise Center each season, typically on the Saturday before Christmas.

Enterprise Center also hosts a variety of non-sporting events each year, including concerts, ice shows, family events, professional wrestling, and other events. On average, the facility sees about 175 total events per year, drawing nearly two million guests annually to downtown St. Louis.

The facility is frequently chosen by the NCAA to host championship events, including its men's hockey "Frozen Four" in 2007, the women's basketball Final Four in 2001 and 2009, wrestling championships in 2000, 2004, 2005, 2008, 2009, 2012, 2015, and 2017, and several men's and women's basketball Midwest Regional tournament games. After the Missouri Tigers joined the SEC in 2012, St. Louis was added to the list of cities that could serve as hosts for the men's SEC men's basketball tournament, doing so for the first time in March 2018, at the completion of the 2017–2018 regular season.

The building is operated by SLB Acquisition Holdings LLC, owner of the St. Louis Blues, under its chairman, Tom Stillman.

Former tenants
Former tenants of Enterprise Center include the Saint Louis Billikens men's basketball team from Saint Louis University, St. Louis Vipers roller hockey team, St. Louis Ambush and St. Louis Steamers indoor soccer teams, the St. Louis Stampede arena football team, and the River City Rage indoor football team.

Seating capacity
The facility's seating capacity for hockey has varied since opening.

Events

Sports
Since 1995, Enterprise Center has hosted the Missouri Valley Conference men's basketball tournament, commonly referred to as Arch Madness.
The PBR has hosted an Unleash the Beast Series (formerly Bud Light Cup Series and Built Ford Tough Series) event at this venue annually since 1997, making it one of the longest-running events on the tour. In 2019 the event was named the Mason Lowe Memorial in honor of bull rider Mason Lowe, an Exeter, Missouri, native who died from injuries he sustained at a PBR Velocity Tour event in Denver on January 15, 2019.
1997 Conference USA men's basketball tournament.
Hosts the Mid-States Club Hockey Association Challenge Cup and Wickenheiser Cup finals for high school hockey teams in St. Louis
1998 NCAA Division I men's basketball tournament Midwest Regional
Women's Final Four in 2001 and 2009
Hosted the 2006 State Farm U.S. Figure Skating Championships in January 2006, which was used as the primary means to select the United States Figure Skating team for the 2006 Winter Olympics.
2014 and 2016 NCAA men's basketball tournament Round of 64 and Round of 32
NCAA Division I Wrestling Championships host in 2000, 2004, 2005, 2008, 2009, 2012, 2015 and 2017
Hosts yearly NBA preseason games. The most recent game took place on October 24, 2014, between the Chicago Bulls and the Minnesota Timberwolves.
In 2018, the Scottrade Center hosted the Southeastern Conference men's basketball tournament for the first time in the center's history.
In 2019, Enterprise Center hosted the Stanley Cup Finals for the first time when the Blues faced the Boston Bruins in games: 3, 4 & 6.
The facility hosted the 2020 NHL All-Star Game.
The facility planned to host the 2020 NCAA Division I men's basketball tournament 1st & 2nd rounds, but the tournament was cancelled due to the effects of the COVID-19 pandemic.

MMA & Boxing
Hosted the Cory Spinks vs. Zab Judah undisputed welterweight title fight in 2005, with more than 22,000 fans in attendance. Spinks and fellow St. Louis native Devon Alexander were regularly featured on Don King-promoted cards at Enterprise Center throughout the late 2000s. The last major pro boxing event at the arena was Alexander vs. Marcos Maidana in 2011.
The first MMA card at the venue was Strikeforce: Lawler vs. Shields in 2009, featuring Robbie Lawler who at the time trained in nearby Granite City, Illinois in the main event. Strikeforce would return twice to Enterprise Center in 2010, first with Strikeforce: Heavy Artillery and then with Strikeforce: Henderson vs. Babalu II. Bellator MMA debuted at the venue in 2015, with Bellator 138: Unfinished Business featuring Kimbo Slice facing Ken Shamrock. That promotion has since held two other cards at Enterprise Center, including the Bellator 157: Dynamite II MMA/kickboxing supercard on June 25, 2016, highlighted by House Springs, Missouri native Michael Chandler winning the Bellator Lightweight Championship by knocking out Patricky Freire. The Ultimate Fighting Championships made its St. Louis debut in 2018 with UFC Fight Night: Stephens vs. Choi.
Annually hosts the "Guns 'n' Hoses" amateur boxing/MMA show, where local police officers and firefighters fight to benefit the BackStoppers, a charity that supports families of first responders who have died in the line of duty. Held on the night before Thanksgiving, it traditionally draws a full house.

Wrestling
No Mercy (2001)
Survivor Series (1998) 		
Raw is Owen 		
Badd Blood: In Your House 		
Judgment Day (2007) 		
Elimination Chamber (2010) 		
Royal Rumble (2012) 		
Raw 1000 		
Extreme Rules (2013)
Survivor Series (2014) 		
Battleground (2015)
Money in the Bank (2017)

Many historic WWE moments have taken place at the Enterprise Center. Former WWE and World Heavyweight Champion Kane made his WWE debut at this arena in 1997 at the event Badd Blood: In Your House. At that same event, the first Hell In A Cell match took place between Shawn Michaels and The Undertaker, which received a five-star rating from the Wrestling Observer Newsletter. The Rock won his first WWE Championship in the building at the Survivor Series event in 1998. Chris Jericho won his first World Championship in this arena at the No Mercy event in 2001, and won his latest World Championship in the arena at the Elimination Chamber event in 2010. In 2005 John Cena was revealed here as the first draft pick for Monday Night Raw, where he would remain for most of his career. Dave Batista won his second WWE Championship at the Elimination Chamber event in 2010. The 1000th episode of Monday Night Raw was also held there. At the 2014 Survivor Series Sting made his official debut in WWE. In November 2018 on SmackDown, Daniel Bryan won his fourth WWE Championship. Arguably the most emotional wrestling card held at the Enterprise Center was "Raw is Owen", held in the aftermath of Owen Hart's death the previous night at Over the Edge across the state in Kansas City. That night, ten matches were held with all booking put aside, and many wrestlers and fans paid tribute to the popular Hart.

Concerts

References

External links

 

1994 establishments in Missouri
Basketball venues in St. Louis
Boxing venues in the United States
College ice hockey venues in the United States
Defunct college basketball venues in the United States
Sports venues completed in 1994
Indoor ice hockey venues in Missouri
Indoor soccer venues in Missouri
Mixed martial arts venues in the United States
National Hockey League venues
Saint Louis Billikens basketball venues
Sports venues in St. Louis
Tourist attractions in St. Louis
Wrestling venues in the United States
Indoor arenas in Missouri
Downtown West, St. Louis
Enterprise Holdings
Sports venues in Missouri
Basketball venues in Missouri
St. Louis Blues